Avihepadnavirus is a genus of viruses, in the family Hepadnaviridae. Birds serve as natural hosts. There are three species in this genus. Diseases associated with this genus include: hepatitis, hepatocellular carcinomas (chronic infections), and cirrhosis.

Taxonomy
The genus contains the following species:
 Duck hepatitis B virus
 Heron hepatitis B virus
 Parrot hepatitis B virus

Structure
Viruses in the genus Avihepadnavirus are enveloped, with spherical geometries, and T=4 symmetry. The diameter is around 42 nm. Genomes are circular, around 3.2kb in length. The genome codes for 7 proteins.

Life cycle
Viral replication is nucleo-cytoplasmic. Replication follows the dsDNA(RT) replication model. DNA-templated transcription, specifically dsDNA-RT transcription, with some alternative splicing mechanism is the method of transcription. Translation takes place by ribosomal shunting. The virus exits the host cell by budding, and  nuclear pore export. Birds serve as the natural host. Transmission routes are parental, sexual, and blood.

References

External links
 ICTV Report: Hepadnaviridae
 Viralzone: Avihepadnavirus

Hepadnaviridae
Virus genera